Brickellia dentata, the leafy brickellbush, is a rare North American  species of flowering plants in the family Asteraceae. It has only been found in Texas in the south-central United States.

Brickellia dentata is a branching shrub sometimes growing up to 120 centimeters (48 inches or 4 feet) tall. Produces numerous yellow or pale green flower heads in a paniculate array.

References

External links
Lady Bird Johnson Wildflower Center, University of Texas
Excerpts from Jim Conrad's Naturalist Newsletter

dentata
Flora of Texas
Plants described in 1836